Zsolt Peto (born 30 November 1987) is a Serbian table tennis player.

He competed at the 2020 Summer Olympics in men's singles and men's team. He was eliminated in singles in first round by Greek table tennis player Panagiotis Gionis.

References

External links

Serbian male table tennis players
1987 births
Living people
Olympic table tennis players of Serbia
Table tennis players at the 2020 Summer Olympics
Sportspeople from Novi Sad
Hungarians in Vojvodina